is a former Japanese rugby union player who played as a hooker. He spent his whole career playing for Toshiba Brave Lupus in Japan's domestic Top League, playing over 10 times. He was named as a backup player for Japan for the 2007 Rugby World Cup, making two appearances in the tournament. He made a further 5 appearances for Japan, scoring a try.

References

External links
itsrugby.co.uk profile

1982 births
Living people
Japanese rugby union players
Rugby union hookers
Toshiba Brave Lupus Tokyo players
Sportspeople from Tokyo